Vijay Pereira is a scholar, consultant and professor at NEOMA Business School, France. He is presently a full professor of Strategic and International Human Capital Management.

Career 
Pereira is the Editor in Chief of the journal International Studies of Management and Organizations, the Associate Editor (Strategic Management and Organizational Behavior) for the Journal of Business Research and the Global Real Impact Editor for the Journal of Knowledge Management.

Pereira is the 2nd ranked publishing scholar in business and management globally for the year’s 2021-22 and the highest ranked publishing scholar in Europe for the same period (P-rank).

Books authored 
 Pereira, V., and Malik, A. (2015). Human capital in the Indian IT / BPO industry. Palgrave Macmillan, London. ISBN 9781137481504. Springer. ISBN 978-1-137-48152-8.
 Pereira, V., and Malik, A. (2015). Investigating cultural aspects in Indian organizations: Empirical Evidence. In: India Studies in Business and Economics, New York. Springer. ISBN 9783319160979 10.1007/978-3-319-16098-6.Springer. ISBN 978-3-319-16098-6.
 Malik, A., and Pereira, V. (2016). Indian culture and work organisations in transition, Routledge (Taylor and Francis), London. Routledge. ISBN 9781315625447.
 Lasrado, F., and Pereira, V. (2017). Achieving Sustainable Business Excellence: The Role of Human Capital, In: Palgrave Macmillan, London. Springer. ISBN 978-3-319-73314-2.
 Sikdar, A., and Pereira, V. (2018). Business and Management Practices in South Asia: A Collection of Case Studies. Palgrave Macmillan, UAE. Springer. ISBN 9789811313998.
 Chahal, H., Pereira, V., and Gupta Jeevan Jyoti. (2020). Sustainable Business Practices for Rural Development: The Role of Intellectual Capital. Palgrave Macmillan, London. Springer ISBN 978-981-13-9298-6.
 Pereira, V., Neal, M., Temouri, Y., and Qureshi, W. (2020). Human Capital in the Middle East: A UAE Perspective. Palgrave Macmillan, London.Springer. ISBN 978-3-030-42211-0 
 Pereira, V., Temouri, Y., and Vaz, D. (2022). Managing Sustainable Business Relationships in a Post Covid-19 Era: Towards a Dodecahedron Shaped Stakeholder Model. Springer Briefs in Business, Springer, New York.
 Budhwar, P and Pereira, V. (2023, forthcoming). ‘Doing Business in the Middle East’. Routledge, London, UK.Routledge. ISBN 9780367437855.

References

External links 
 Vijay Pereira at Academia.edu

Year of birth missing (living people)
Living people